CP24 Breakfast is a Canadian morning television news show that airs on CP24 (Toronto's 24-hour local television news service) weekdays from 5:00 a.m. to 9:00 a.m., and weekends from 7:00 a.m. to 9:00 a.m.

The weekday edition does not currently have a host following the retirement of George Lagogianes. It is anchored by Nick Dixon and Jennifer Hsiung, Mika Midolo (temporarily off CP24 Breakfast due to cancer diagnoses) is as the transit and weather specialist, Bill Coulter is the meteorologist, and Jee-Yun Lee is the remote and Live Eye Host. 

The 5:00 a.m. - 5:30 a.m. portion of the program is branded as CP24 Before Breakfast, and the 5:30 a.m. - 6:00 a.m. block is branded as CP24 Early Breakfast.

History (2009 - 2018)
CP24 Breakfast first aired on March 26, 2009, displacing the simulcast of Citytv Toronto's Breakfast Television, which is now owned by Rogers Media and had been airing on CP24 since its inception in 1998. On the same day of the launch, CTVglobemedia (now Bell Media) relaunched its Toronto-based oldies music radio station, 1050 CHUM, as a news/talk radio station CP24 Radio 1050 which the station operated primarily as a simulcast of CP24's television counterpart, which was later reverted to an all-sports radio format as TSN Radio 1050 as of April 2011. Prior to the launch of CP24 Breakfast, from February 2009, until March 25, 2009, CP24 had its own news inserts during commercial breaks on BT known as More On CP24 in which CP24 anchors would do extended morning news updates. Unofficially Citytv hosts had constantly referred to Breakfast Television being "only on Citytv, Cable 7" several months before CP24 launched its own new morning show.

The program debuted with Ann Rohmer as news anchor, Melissa Grelo and Matte Babel as co-hosts, live reporter Cam Wooley, weather specialist Nalini Sharma, and Bob Summers, Steve Anthony and Mika Middolo as part of the traffic team. Babel switched to the "Live Eye" six months later before leaving in 2010, Anthony took his place as cohost. Rohmer exited the show in June 2010 and was later replaced by Lindsey Deluce. Sharma went on maternity leave in early 2012 and switched to the "Live Eye" upon returning a year later before leaving the show altogether in 2014. Bill Coulter joined the weather team in her place. Deluce took a maternity leave in mid-2012 and was temporarily replaced by Farah Nasser who herself went on maternity leave, six months later. George Lagogianes filled her spot throughout her second maternity leave beginning in the fall of 2014. Lindsey Deluce returned to CP24 in late 2015; however, she soon left to join CTV's sister station's new breakfast show Your Morning. Gurdeep Ahulwaila took over as Anchor following her departure. 

On March 19, 2011, CP24 extended its morning show with the launch of CP24 Breakfast Weekend Edition, becoming the first station in Toronto to serve a morning show seven days a week. The program was initially hosted by Gurdeep Ahulwalia (later replaced by Nneka Elliott) and Pooja Handa (later replaced by Travis Dhanraj).

In August 2011, CP24 once again extended its breakfast show to include Before Breakfast, hosted by Lindsey Deluce, which airs weekdays from 5:00 a.m. - 5:30 a.m.

2019–present: Program Changes 

 March 26, 2019 - CP24 Breakfast celebrated its 10th anniversary where all former hosts returned to celebrate the show. 
 September 2019 - Jamie Gutfreund announced he was moving to another position on CP24 and was leaving the CP24 Breakfast Weekend show, as well as the Live Eye host for the weekday show. He was replaced with Brandon Gonez from Your Morning.
 March 2020 - Following the onset of the COVID-19 pandemic CP24 Breakfast suspended in-studio guests and host moved to socially distance while on the air. The weekend edition was also suspended and took on a similar format to the rest of CP24 daily programming. The Weekend edition still features the milestones segment, however it is typically prerecorded by a weekday host. 
 March 18, 2021 - Cam Woolley announced he would be retiring after 13 years on the morning show. During his time on CP24 Breakfast, he covered every major story in Toronto and was part of the original cast of. He officially retired on April 15, 2021. His final show was well celebrated, featuring many well wishers and messages from viewers and community figures.
 August 10, 2021 - Pooja Handa unexpectedly announced just 10 minutes before the ending of the day's show that it would be her last and she would be departing CP24 Breakfast after six years as host of the Weekday show. Her position was later removed and no replacement host was announced to fill the vacancy.  
 August 27, 2021 - Only weeks after Handa made a surprise departure, news anchor Gurdeep Ahluwalia also unexpectedly left the show, leaving in the same fashion, only making the announcement 10 minutes before the show ended. These departures are unusual, as most past departures have featured a fanfared show with many goodbye messages. The official social media accounts of CP24 and CP24 Breakfast failed to mention or post about either Ahluwalia or Handa's departures. It was announced that Nick Dixon would immediately take over as news anchor. It was later revealed that Handa and Ahluwalia would go on to launch their own Morning Radio show on 98.1 CHFI titled the "Pooja and Gurdeep Show" 
 Summer 2022 - CP24 welcomed back regular appearances from in-studio guests and returned to more frequent Live Eye segments hosted by Jee-Yun Lee 
 December 13th, 2022 - George Lagogianes announced he would be retiring from CP24 Breakfast after 36 years in Broadcasting. He joined CP24 Breakfast in 2014 while covering a maternity leave for Lindsey Deluce, following Steve Anthony's Departure in 2017 Lagogianes was promoted to Co-Host. His final show featured many CP24 Breakfast Alumni with video messages and tributes from Toronto Mayor John Tory and viewers of CP24 Breakfast.   A replacement for George Lagogianes has yet to be announced.

Timeline of hosts

Set
The CP24 studio is on the second floor of 299 Queen Street West. Large north-facing windows look out towards Queen Street. The set and newsroom is home to CP24 Breakfast and most of the other CP24-produced programming. During the summer months the breakfast show also uses an outdoor patio for some broadcasts.

Current Presenters

Weekdays
 Hosts: Mika Midolo, Bill Coulter, Jennifer Hsiung and Nick Dixon  
 Remote host: Jee-Yun Lee
 Reporter: Courtney Heals (current on mat leave), rotating anchors

Weekends
 Hosts: rotating anchors
 Weather: rotating anchors

Former notable presenters
Melissa Grelo: former host
Steve Antony: former host
Lindsey Deluce: former news anchor 
Ann Rohmer: former news anchor 
Jamie Gutfreund: former Live Eye reporter, weekend host/anchor 
Cam Woolley: former reporter 
Pooja Handa: former host, now with CHFI-FM
Gurdeep Ahluwalia: former host, now with CHFI-FM
George Lagogianes: former host

Awards and nominations
2020: Nomination for "Best Morning Show" - Academy of Canadian Cinema & Television

References

External links
 CP24 Breakfast

2000s Canadian television talk shows
2000s Canadian television news shows
2009 Canadian television series debuts
Canadian talk radio programs
Television series by Bell Media
Television shows filmed in Toronto
Television morning shows in Canada
2010s Canadian television talk shows
2010s Canadian television news shows
2020s Canadian television news shows